Květná is a municipality and village in Svitavy District in the Pardubice Region of the Czech Republic. It has about 400 inhabitants.

Notable people
Ludwig Wieden (1869–1947), Austrian painter

References

 

Villages in Svitavy District